Name that Tune or Guess the tune is an Armenian Entertainment television program developed by Avet Barseghyan. The series premiered on Armenia 1 on September 8, 2015.
The First Public Television of Armenia has also bought the copyright to show the popular and beloved entertaining musical program. From now on, from Monday to Friday all the viewers of the First Channel will have the chance of being a part of this entertaining program, checking their musical knowledge, as well as watching famous singers, actors, public figures playing the game, such as Hovhannes Davtyan, Arsen Grigoryan, Aram MP3, Sona Shahgeldyan, Mher Khachatryan, Gor Hakobyan, Arpi Gabrielyan, Gevorg Martirosyan. 

The host of the program is Avet Barseghyan.

External links

 

Armenian-language television shows
Public Television Company of Armenia original programming
2010s Armenian television series